The Female Bunch is a 1969 action film directed by Al Adamson, and starring Russ Tamblyn and Lon Chaney Jr. (in his final feature film). The plot centered on a group of violent, man-hating female criminals who cause trouble around the Mexican border.

The Female Bunch was shot in the summer of 1969 at the Spahn Ranch during the time that it was occupied by the Manson Family. The film was distributed on DVD by Troma Entertainment.

Plot

After a string of bad times with men, Sandy tries to kill herself. Co-waitress Libby saves her and takes her to meet some female friends of hers who live on a ranch in the desert. Grace, the leader of the gang, puts Sandy through her initiation and they get on with the real job of running drugs across the Mexican border, hassling poor farmers, taking any man they please, and generally raising a little hell. Soon Sandy becomes unsure if this is the life for her, but it may be too late to get out.

Cast
 Russ Tamblyn as Bill
 Jennifer Bishop as Grace
 Lon Chaney Jr. as Monti
 Regina Carrol as Libby
 Megan Timothy

Production
In addition to Spahn Ranch, parts of the film were shot in Hanksville and Capitol Reef in Utah as well as Las Vegas, Nevada.

In popular culture
The film shot at Spahn Ranch, the setting for the short story "Another Fish Story" by English film critic and author Kim Newman.  In the story, a mystic drifter makes a deal with Adamson to employ the over-the-hill Chaney for a mysterious mission in the desert in exchange for promising that the Manson Family's rowdy followers will not interrupt the film's shooting schedule any further with their disruptive behavior.

See also
 List of American films of 1969

References

External links

 

1969 films
American sexploitation films
American independent films
Films directed by Al Adamson
1969 Western (genre) films
American Western (genre) films
Films shot in California
Films shot in Utah
Films shot in the Las Vegas Valley
1969 independent films
1960s English-language films
1960s American films